The original South Korean counterpart of the television mystery music game show I Can See Your Voice premiered the seventh season on Mnet and tvN on January 17, 2020.

Due to the COVID-19 pandemic, this program is filmed under health and safety protocols being implemented for this season.

Gameplay

Format
Under the original format, the guest artist can eliminate one or two mystery singers after each round. The game concludes with the last mystery singer standing which depends on the outcome of a duet performance with a guest artist.

Rewards
If the singer is good, he/she will have release a digital single; if the singer is bad, he/she wins .

Rounds
Each episode presents the guest artist with six people whose identities and singing voices are kept concealed until they are eliminated to perform on the "stage of truth" or remain in the end to perform the final duet.

Episodes

Guest artists

Panelists

Reception

Television ratings

Source: Nielsen Media

Notes

References

I Can See Your Voice (South Korean game show)
2020 South Korean television seasons